Bernard Beckett (born 13 October 1967)  is a New Zealand writer of fiction for young adults. His work includes novels and plays. Beckett has taught Drama, Mathematics and English at a number of high schools in the Wellington Region, and is currently teaching students at Hutt Valley High School in Lower Hutt.

Selected works
 Lester (novel, 1999) 
 Red Cliff (novel, 2000) 
 Jolt (novel, 2001) 
 No Alarms (novel, 2002) 
 3 Plays: Puck, Plan 10 From Outer Space, The End Of The World As We Know It 2003
 Home Boys (novel, 2003) 
 Malcolm and Juliet (novel, 2004) 
 Deep Fried - with Clare Knighton (novel, 2005) 
 Genesis (novel, 2006) 
 Falling for Science (non-fiction, 2007) 
 Limbo (film, 2008)
 Loaded (film, 2009)
Last Dance (film, 2011)
Lament (film, 2012)

Awards
 2005: Esther Glen Award at the LIANZA Children's Book Awards, for Malcolm and Juliet.
 2005: Winner  Young Adult Fiction Category of the New Zealand Post Book Awards for Children and Young Adults, for Malcolm and Juliet.
 2007: Winner Young Adult Fiction Category of the New Zealand Post Book Awards for Children and Young Adults, for Genesis.
2010: Winner of Prix Sorcières in the Adolescent novels category, for Genesis

References

External links
 Longacre press pages on Beckett
 NZ Book Council biography
 Audio: In conversation on BBC World Service discussion programme The Forum
 Bernard Beckett website

Living people
1967 births
New Zealand writers